Scott Matthew Emerson (born December 22, 1971) is an American professional baseball former pitcher and current coach. He is the pitching coach for the Oakland Athletics of Major League Baseball.

Career
Emerson attended Shadow Mountain High School in Phoenix, Arizona, and Scottsdale Community College in Scottsdale, Arizona.  He was drafted by the San Diego Padres in the 21st round of the 1990 MLB draft from Shadow Mountain High School and the Baltimore Orioles in the 40th round of the 1991 MLB draft from Scottsdale Community College.  A former left-handed pitcher, he played in minor league baseball from 1992 through 1997, spending the first three seasons of his career with the Orioles' organization, and in the Boston Red Sox' Organization 1995 through 1996.  In 1997, Emerson played in the independent Texas–Louisiana League for the Rio Grande Valley White Wings.

Emerson reached AA before beginning his coaching career.  In 2000 Emerson joined the Pittsburgh Pirates Organization as Pitching Coach of their Gulf Coast League.  In 2001, he was named Pitching Coach of their A Team, the Williamsport Crosscutters.  He joined the Oakland Athletics minor league system as the pitching coach of the Modesto Athletics in 2002 where he spent 2 seasons.  He spent 2005–2006 with the Stockton Ports and 2007–2010 with the Midland Rockhounds. He then spent 2 seasons in AAA with the Sacramento River Cats before being named the Minor League Pitching Coordinator in 2013.

Emerson has also coached internationally in the Mexican Winter League with the Los Mochis Caneros (2004) and the Phoenix Desert Dogs of the Major League Baseball's Arizona Fall (2005).

After the 2014 season, the Athletics named Emerson their major league bullpen coach. He was promoted to the position of pitching coach on June 15, 2017.

Personal life
Emerson married his wife, Jill, in 2001.  They reside in North Carolina.

Since 2011, Emerson has traveled to Europe each year in the off-season to coach for Purpose-Driven Baseball in the Czech Republic and other European countries.

References

External links

1971 births
Living people
Albany Polecats players
Baseball coaches from Arizona
Baseball coaches from Maryland
Baseball pitchers
Baseball players from Arizona
Baseball players from Baltimore
Bluefield Orioles players
Bowie Baysox players
Frederick Keys players
High Desert Mavericks players
Major League Baseball bullpen coaches
Minor league baseball coaches
Major League Baseball pitching coaches
Oakland Athletics coaches
Rio Grande Valley White Wings players
Sarasota Red Sox players
Scottsdale Fighting Artichokes baseball players
Trenton Thunder players